Darreh Shureh (also Romanized as Darreh Shūreh and Darreh Shūr) is a village in Jelogir Rural District, in the Central District of Pol-e Dokhtar County, Lorestan Province, Iran. At the 2006 census, its population was 58, in 11 families.

References 

Towns and villages in Pol-e Dokhtar County